Brachycythara gibba, is an extinct species of sea snail, a marine gastropod mollusk in the family Mangeliidae.

Description

Distribution
This extinct marine species can be found in Pliocene strata of Jamaica and Miocene strata of the Dominican Republic; age range: 11.608 to 2.588 Ma

References

 Guppy, Robert John Lechmere. Descriptions of Tertiary fossils from the Antillean region. Vol. 19. No. 1110. US Government Printing Office, 1896.

External links
 Worldwide Mollusk Species Data Base: Brachycythara gibba

gibba